Mazhar Shaikh known professionally as Arhaan Khan is an Indian actor and model. He is known for  his portrayal of Rana Singh Ahlawat in Badho Bahu on &TV. In 2019, he participated in Bigg Boss 13 on Colors TV.

Career
He started his career as a model and actor where he did many campaigns and appeared in many fashion shows. In 2016 he started his acting career when he made his television debut on &TV Badho Bahu as Rana Ahlawaat, a wrestler character.

In 2017, He made his film debut with V. Vijayendra Prasad feature film SriValli as Majnu.
 In late 2019, he joined the reality show Bigg Boss 13. He got evicted on 16 November 2019 after his very short 2 weeks stay in which he failed to get the public support. In late November, it was announced that he will be returning to the show as a wild-card entry again. However, on 31 December, he was evicted again.

Personal life
 They participated in Bigg Boss 13. In Bigg Boss House, Salman Khan made a statement that Arhaan has been married before, and has a 4-year old child too which was not known to Rashami Desai. After coming out from the Bigg Boss house in 2020, Rashami Desai broke up with Arhaan.

Filmography

Film

Television

References

External links
 
 Arhaan Khan on Facebook
 

Year of birth missing (living people)
Place of birth missing (living people)
Living people
Bigg Boss (Hindi TV series) contestants
Indian television actors
Indian male models
Indian television personalities